Opeti Fonua (born 26 May 1986) is a Tongan rugby union player who plays number 8 for SU Agen, having transferred from Newcastle Falcons. Fonua is known for his immense size and strength, but also for his surprisingly high levels of speed and agility for his size (his official weight according to his Su Agen profile is 150 kg), although in the past he has been listed as lighter. A highly physical player, both with and without the ball, Fonua is known for big tackles and strong carries.

On 10 February 2015, it was announced Fonua had signed for Leicester Tigers Fonua was named in Tonga's 2015 Rugby World Cup squad.

References

1986 births
Living people
Tonga international rugby union players
SU Agen Lot-et-Garonne players
Tongan expatriate rugby union players
Expatriate rugby union players in France
Tongan expatriate sportspeople in France
Leicester Tigers players
Newcastle Falcons players
Rugby union locks